Copenhagen is a live album by Galaxie 500. It was recorded on December 1, 1990, the final date of their last European tour.

Track listing

Releases

References

External links 
Lyrics and Tablature 

Galaxie 500 albums
1997 live albums
Albums produced by Kramer (musician)